National Secondary Route 211, or just Route 211 (or ) is a National Road Route of Costa Rica, located in the San José province.

Description
In San José province the route covers San José canton (San Francisco de Dos Ríos district), Curridabat canton (Curridabat, Tirrases districts).

References

Highways in Costa Rica